Coleophora derasofasciella is a moth of the family Coleophoridae. It is found in the Alps in Austria, Germany, Italy and Slovenia and also in alpine regions in northern Russia and at one spot in northern Sweden (previously described as Coleophora paeltsaella, Palmqvist & Hellberg, 1999).

References

derasofasciella
Moths described in 1952
Moths of Europe